This is a list of 47 species in Halobates, a genus of water striders in the family Gerridae.

Halobates species

 Halobates acherontis J.Polhemus, 1982 g
 Halobates alluaudi Bergroth, 1893 g
 Halobates browni Herring, 1961 g
 Halobates bryani Herring, 1961 g
 Halobates calyptus Herring, 1961 g
 Halobates darwini Herring, 1961 g
 Halobates dianae Zettel, 2001 g
 Halobates elephanta Andersen & Foster, 1992 g
 Halobates esakii Miyamoto, 1967 g
 Halobates fijiensis Herring, 1958 g
 Halobates flaviventris Eschscholtz, 1822 g
 Halobates formidabilis (Distant, 1910) g
 Halobates galatea Herring, 1961 g
 Halobates germanus Buchanan White, 1883 g
 Halobates hawaiiensis Usinger, 1938 i c g
 Halobates hayanus Buchanan White, 1883 g
 Halobates herringi J.Polhemus & Cheng, 1982 g
 Halobates japonicus Esaki, 1924 g
 Halobates katherinae Herring, 1958 g
 Halobates kelleni Herring, 1961 g
 Halobates lannae Andersen & Weir, 1994 g
 Halobates liaoi Zettel, 2005 g
 Halobates maculatus Schadow, 1922 g
 Halobates mariannarum Esaki, 1924 g
 Halobates matsumurai Esaki, 1924 g
 Halobates melleus Linnavuori, 1971 g
 Halobates micans Eschscholtz, 1822 i c g b
 Halobates mjobergi Hale, 1925 g
 Halobates murphyi J.Polhemus & D.Polhemus, 1991 g
 Halobates nereis Herring, 1961 g
 Halobates panope Herring, 1961 g
 Halobates peronis Herring, 1961 g
 Halobates poseidon Herring, 1961 g
 Halobates princeps Buchanan White, 1883 g
 Halobates proavus Buchanan White, 1883 g
 Halobates regalis Carpenter, 1892 g
 Halobates robinsoni Andersen & Weir, 2003 g
 Halobates robustus Barber, 1925 g
 Halobates salotae Herring, 1961 g
 Halobates sericeus Eschscholtz, 1822 i c g b  (Pacific pelagic water strider)
 Halobates sexualis Distant, 1903 g
 Halobates sobrinus Buchanan White, 1883 g
 Halobates splendens Witlaczil, 1886 g
 Halobates tethys Herring, 1961 g
 Halobates trynae Herring, 1964 g
 Halobates whiteleggei Skuse, 1891 g
 Halobates zephyrus Herring, 1961 g

Data sources: i = ITIS, c = Catalogue of Life, g = GBIF, b = Bugguide.net

References

Halobates